Factoring can refer to the following:

 Factoring (finance), a form of commercial finance
 Factorization, a mathematical concept
 Decomposition (computer science)
 A rule in resolution theorem proving, see Resolution (logic)#Factoring

See also 
 Code refactoring
 Factor (disambiguation)